The Liverpool Five were a beat group that was part of the British Invasion-era of the 1960s. The group played throughout Europe and Asia before achieving the peak of their success in the United States between 1965 and 1967.

Career
Formed in England in 1963 as the Steve Laine Combo, the group comprised Steve Laine (lead vocals), Ken Cox (guitar and vocals), Dave Burgess (bass and vocals), Ron Henley (keyboards, sax and vocals) and Jimmy May (drums and vocals). The Steve Laine Combo played in clubs such as the Flamingo in Soho, and were spotted by the owners Rik and Johnny Gunnell. On a tour of Germany arranged by the Gunnells in early 1964, the band was signed to a management contract by German impresario Karl Buchmann, who added them to a large-venue tour of Germany and Austria. Following that tour, at Buchmann's suggestion, the group changed its name to The Liverpool Five, to capitalize on the international popularity of The Beatles. Despite the name, none of the group members were from Liverpool; all were Londoners except Burgess, who was from Cumbria.
 
Before leaving Germany, the band recorded an album on CBS Records for European release titled Tokio International, and a single "Tokio" / "SkinnyMinny", the first releases under the name '5Liverpools'. While in Germany in 1964 the band successfully auditioned to tour Japan, and performed at the Korakuen Arena as part of the Tokyo Olympics. One UK single, "Lum D' Lum D' Lum High" / "Good Golly Miss Molly", as the 'Liverpool 5', was released on the Pye subsidiary label, Piccadilly Records in 1964.

After touring the Far East, where few other British rock bands had been, they moved to the West Coast of the United States in March 1965, with an initial base in Spokane, Washington, before settling as residents in Los Angeles. From their new base, they played all over the US and Canada, by themselves and with acts including The Lovin' Spoonful, Stevie Wonder, The Kinks and The Rolling Stones. One of the band's biggest US concerts was as a featured artist on the 'Beach Boys Summer Spectacular' at the Hollywood Bowl in July 1965, alongside The Beach Boys, The Righteous Brothers and The Byrds.
 
In the United States, under contract with RCA Victor, the group released a number of singles, together with two albums produced by Al Schmitt. In 1966 their recording of Chip Taylor's "Any Way That You Want Me" (b/w Oscar Brown Jr's "The Snake") became their only appearance on the national chart, spending one week on the Billboard Hot 100 at #98. They also appeared on television shows such as American Bandstand, Where the Action Is and Hullabaloo, plus many music shows on local stations throughout the US. Local radio stations often sponsored their concerts.

Two albums on RCA Victor, Arrive (LSP 3583) (1966) and Out of Sight (LSP 3682) (1967), were reasonably successful, particularly in the Pacific Northwest. The group disbanded in 1968, by which point Fred Dennis from Spokane, Washington, later of the Sonics, had replaced Dave Burgess on bass. Drummer Jimmy May returned to live in England while the others remained in the United States and embarked on new careers in various professions.

Before finally disbanding, they recorded one last single for RCA under the name Common Market (RCA 47-9302). The tracks were the Cat Stevens composition "I Love My Dog" backed with Tim Buckley's "Wings".

Later years
In 1999, Rockinbeat Records released Liverpool Five- Arrive- Out of Sight in Europe, a CD containing all tracks from the group's two RCA albums. In April 2008, Sundazed Records released a CD with eighteen of the group's RCA recordings, which were remastered and packaged as The Best of the Liverpool Five (SC11158). 

In 2010, the group got together for a long awaited reunion concert in Sacramento, California in order to celebrate the 70th birthday of lead singer Steve Laine. Dennis Moffett joined the band on drums for the first reunion. In 2016, a second reunion concert for the ages took place in Fairfield, California. This time to celebrate the 70th birthday of guitarist Ken Cox, the youngest member of the group. James Grayberg joined the band on drums for the second reunion.

References

External Links
 
 

Beat groups
English rock music groups
Musical groups established in 1963
Musical groups disestablished in 1968